Getter Laar (born 21 November 1989) is an Estonian footballer who plays as a goalkeeper for French club FC Metz and the Estonia national team.

Club career
In January 2011 Laar spent time training with Chelsea of the English FA WSL, playing in a friendly against Watford. She had ambitions to move abroad but wanted to finish her university education first. She secured a transfer to French Division 1 Féminine club Guingamp in summer 2013, through the contacts of Estonian national coach Keith Boanas. In 2013 Laar was named Estonia's female Player of the Year.

References

External links
 Profile at FC Metz 
 
 
 

1989 births
Living people
Estonian women's footballers
Estonia women's international footballers
Estonian expatriate footballers
Estonian expatriate sportspeople in France
Expatriate women's footballers in France
FC Metz (women) players
Division 1 Féminine players
Sportspeople from Pärnu
Women's association football goalkeepers
Pärnu JK players
FC Flora (women) players
En Avant Guingamp (women) players